Ioannis Leivatidis (born 29 January 1974) is a Greek bobsledder. He competed in the two man event at the 2002 Winter Olympics.

References

External links
 

1974 births
Living people
Greek male bobsledders
Olympic bobsledders of Greece
Bobsledders at the 2002 Winter Olympics
Bobsledders from Chicago